Malique Williams (born August 13, 1988) is an Antiguan swimmer, who specialized in sprint freestyle events. Williams qualified for the men's 50 m freestyle, as a 15-year-old, at the 2004 Summer Olympics in Athens. He received a Universality place from FINA in an entry time of 34.04. He challenged seven other swimmers in heat two, including 37-year-old Mamadou Ouedraogo of Burkina Faso. He posted a lifetime best of 32.86 to secure seventh spot over Malawi's Yona Walesi by a 1.15-second margin. Williams failed to advance into the semifinals, as he placed eighty-second overall out of 86 swimmers in the preliminaries.

References

1988 births
Living people
Antigua and Barbuda male freestyle swimmers
Olympic swimmers of Antigua and Barbuda
Swimmers at the 2004 Summer Olympics